Makabi Warszawa, in English Makabi Warsaw, founded in 1915 in Warsaw, Poland was a Polish sports club founded by the Jewish Gymnastic and Sports Association "Maccabi" in Warsaw. It was the largest multi-section Jewish sports club in the Second Polish Republic.

Makabi Warszawa suspended its activities in 1939 after upon the Nazi occupation of Poland during the Holocaust, as German occupation authorities banned all Jewish unions, associations, and sports clubs. It was reactivated in 2014.

History

1915-1940

The club was established in 1915.  The name "Maccabee" is derived from Judah Maccabee, one of the leaders of the Maccabean Revolt of the Jewish Maccabees against the Seleucids. The goal of the Jewish Gymnastic and Sports Association "Maccabi", established in 1915, was to "rationally educate Jewish youth". Makabi Warszawa provided sports activities to Jewish schools, organized excursions and sports camps, trained sports instructors, and attached great importance to tournaments organized on the occasions of Jewish holidays and Jewish games (the Maccabiah Games). Its members participated in 18 sports, and competed in Polish sports matches.

In the years 1915–1922, Makabi Warszawa's headquarters was at ul. Długa 50, and from 1922 it was in the Simons Passage and had a gym and boxing halls there. It owned, among others playground with an athletics track on Aleja Zieleniecka in Praga-Południe district and its own marina and bathing area on the Vistula River.

Beginning in 1925, the Makabi Warszawa football team had as one of its players Józef Klotz, who in 1922 while a footballer of Jutrzenka Kraków scored the first goal in the history of the Poland national football team. The Makabi Warszawa football team played, at its best, in the second division of the Polish national football league.

In 1932, Makabi Warszawa had about 2,000 members. It was the largest multi-section Jewish sports club in the Second Polish Republic.The club was shut down in 1939 upon the Nazi occupation of Poland during the Holocaust, as German occupation authorities banned all Jewish unions, associations, and sports clubs.

2014-present
In 2014, Makabi Warszawa was reactivated. It has five sections.

Makabi Warszawa players took part in the 2017 Maccabiah Games in Israel. There, they earned two gold medals and one bronze medal.

See also
 Jutrzenka Kraków
 Lithuanian Sports Club Makabi
 The King of Warsaw (TV series)
 Szapsel Rotholc

References

External links

Further reading 

 Gawkowski R., Encyklopedia klubów sportowych Warszawy i ich najbliższych okolic w latach 1918-39, Warszawa 2007.
 Gawkowski R., Futbol dawnej Warszawy, Warszawa 2013.
 Gawkowski R., Sport w II Rzeczpospolitej, Warszawa 2012.
 Gawkowski R., Wypoczynek w II Rzeczpospolitej, Warszawa 2011.
 Gawkowski R., Barciszewski J., Historia polskiej piłki nożnej, Warszawa 2012.
 Majchrzak M., Makabi, Hasmonea i inne – historia sportu żydowskiego, [w:] Eurosport Onet.sport  [online] http://eurosport.onet.pl/makabi-hasmonea-i-inne-historia-sportu-zydowskiego/dcybq
 Sidorowicz J., Józef Klotz i pierwszy gol dla polskiej reprezentacij, [w:] Gazeta.pl. Kraków [online], http://krakow.wyborcza.pl/krakow/1,35798,12083475,Jozef_Klotz_i_pierwszy_gol_dla_polskiej_reprezentacji.html.
 Sport w przedwojennej Warszawie. Cykliści, Wodniacy, Piłkarze, Warszawa 2012.
 Urban T., Biały i czarny orzeł. Piłkarze w trybach polityki, Katowice 2012.

Jewish football clubs
Jewish Polish history
Warsaw
Multi-sport clubs in Poland
Association football clubs established in 1915
Football clubs in Warsaw
Sports clubs established in 1915
1915 establishments in Poland